Robert Were Fox FRS (26 April 1789 – 25 July 1877) was a British geologist, natural philosopher and inventor.  He is known mainly for his work on the temperature of the earth and his construction of a compass to measure magnetic dip at sea.

Life and family

Fox was born on 26 April 1789 at Falmouth, England, the eldest son of Robert Were Fox (1754–1818) and his wife, Elizabeth Tregelles. He had nine siblings.  The Fox family were members of the Religious Society of Friends (Quakers), and were descended from members who had long settled in Cornwall, although they were not related to George Fox who had introduced the community into the county.

In 1814, Fox the Younger married Maria Barclay (1785–1858), daughter of Robert and Rachel Barclay of Bury Hill, near Dorking, Surrey. Maria's sister, Lucy, married Fox's cousin, George Croker Fox (1784–1850).

Robert Were Fox the Younger and his wife had three children, Anna Maria (1816–1897), Barclay (1817–1855) and Caroline (1819–1871). Both Caroline and Barclay Fox's journals have been published.

Robert Were Fox the Younger died on 25 July 1877 and was buried at the Quaker Burial Ground at Budock.

Business interests 

Fox was involved in many aspects of his family's businesses, along with several of his brothers.  He also served as Honorary Consul of the USA in Falmouth from 1819 to 1854.

Fox and Joel Lean were granted a patent in 1812 for their modifications of steam engines. The grant of patent was described thus: Specification of the Patent granted to Robert Were Fox and Joel Lean, of Budock, near Falmouth; for certain Improvements on Steam Engines, and the Apparatus needful or expedient to be used with the same.

Horticultural interests 
Fox's gardens at Rosehill and Penjerrick, near Falmouth, became noted for the number of exotic plants which he and his son, Barclay, had naturalised. Both are now both open to the public.

Scientific work 

Fox's work was in what today would be referred to as geophysics.  He was distinguished for his researches on the internal temperature of the earth, contributing papers to the Royal Geological Society of Cornwall, and being the first to prove that temperature definitely increases with depth (the geothermal gradient), his observations being conducted in Cornish mines from 1815 for a period of forty years. In 1829 he began a set of experiments on the artificial production of miniature metalliferous veins by means of the long-continued influence of electric currents, and his main results were published in 1836.

In 1834 Fox constructed an improved form of deflector dipping needle compass, or dip circle, for polar navigation.
One was used by Sir James Clark Ross on his Antarctic expedition and used to discover the position of the South magnetic pole.

He was a key person in the development of the Royal Cornwall Polytechnic Society and its promotion of scientific research and training. He was an active member of the British Association for the Advancement of Science. On 2 June 1838 Fox was elected a member of the newly-formed London Electrical Society

Robert Were Fox, his cousin, George Croker Fox (1784–1850) and brother, Alfred Fox, assembled excellent collections of minerals, which are now in the British Museum, given by Arthur Russell.

Honours and activities 
 Fellow of the Royal Society (Elected 9 September 1848)
 The Society owns a collection of letters addressed to Fox and his family.

Selected writings 

The following is a very incomplete list of Fox's writings.  According to the Dictionary of National Biography (1889), Fox authored 52 scientific papers.

Notes

References

  – Information on Bury Hill, Maria Fox's parental home
, Paperback 

 
. This unsigned article tells the history of the family of Robert Barclay (1751–1830), the Anchor Brewery, Southwark, which brought them wealth and their home, Bury Hill, Westcott, a village to the West of Dorking.

Attribution

Further reading

 
 
 
 Letter 1108 (page 518) is from Fox to Faraday in 1838, describing some of Fox's experiments.

External links 
 Image of R W Fox Dip circle at the Science Museum
 Description of the Fox dip circle – The Encyclopædia Britannica (1888). 9th edition, New York, volume 16, page 161.
 Biographical information – The Encyclopædia Britannica (1910). 11th edition, New York, volume 10, pages 767 – 768.
  – Dedicated to Robert Were Fox the Younger

1789 births
1877 deaths
Inventors from Cornwall
Geologists from Cornwall
Mineralogists from Cornwall
British geophysicists
British scientific instrument makers
Fellows of the Royal Society
British Quakers
People from Falmouth, Cornwall
Robert Were